Maine is an unincorporated community in Davie County, North Carolina, United States,   located at the intersection US 158 and Sain Road (SR 1643), north of Mocksville.  The community is sometimes referred to by the variant name "Oak Grove."

References

Unincorporated communities in Davie County, North Carolina
Unincorporated communities in North Carolina